Aditnalta is the easternmost island of Isla Cerro Prieto off the south western area of Mexico. It has several mining sites that include lead, zinc and silver. It is located in Southwestern Mexico. Part of the Oaxaca state, it is bordered by water and the closest town is San Dionisio del Mar. To the south of this island is the Pacific Ocean.

References
 Aditnalta mining information, official site of the mining hub

Pacific islands of Mexico
Geography of Oaxaca